Katputtli is a 2006 Bollywood thriller film directed by Sanjay Khanna. The film stars Mink Brar, Milind Soman, Yukta Mookhey, Sameer Dharmadhikari and Seema Biswas.

Plot

Lisa (Mink Brar) can't remember who she is. She is aware of only two things - her dress is full of blood and she's got a coat full of cash. Her husband Arjun (Milind Soman) is a famous surgeon who does his best to help her remember. So begins a love story in which Arjun tries to make his wife fall in love with him all over again. All going well until Lisa gets a strange feeling about what went wrong that night. She starts getting flashes of blood and money. Arjun can't seem to help her and neither can their friendly neighbor Anju(Yukta Mookhey), who is always around to help Lisa  get better. The mystery unfolds when Anju's husband Dev (Sameer Dharmadhikari), a naval officer and Lisa's college friend, returns. Dev doesn't want to wait till her memory returns and he won't rest until he can figure out how Lisa's life became so twisted. Lisa must decide if she wants to discover the truth or be content with the life Arjun has created for her.

Cast
Mink Brar ...  Lisa
Milind Soman ...  Arjun 
Yukta Mookhey ...  Anju
Sameer Dharmadhikari ...  Dev
Sajid khan....  Dr sharma

Soundtrack

The soundtrack features six songs.  Music for the film is composed by Bappi-Tutul, Punnu Brar, Daboo Malik and Ishq Bector. With original lyrics by Praveen Bhardwaj, Sandeep Nath, Punnu Brar, Karamjeet Kadhowala and Ishq Bector.

Track List

 Mitra Nu - 
 Neele Asmaan Par - 
 Mann Mera - 
 Rafta Rafta - 
 Snake Potion -
 Wild Dreams -

References

External links
Katputtli

2006 films
2000s Hindi-language films
Indian thriller films
2006 thriller films
Hindi-language thriller films